The following are the national records in athletics in Maldives maintained by Maldives' national athletics federation: Athletics Association of Maldives (AAM).

Outdoor

Key to tables:

h = hand timing

A = affected by altitude

Wo = women only race

Men

Women

Indoor

Men

Women

Notes

References
General
Maldivian Outdoor Records (certain running events only) 10 August 2022 updated
Maldivian Outdoor Records 31 December 2019 updated
Specific

External links
AAM web site
Maldivian Athletics Records – Indoor

Maldives
Records
Athletics